Sir Henry Atkins, 5th Baronet (1726–1742), of Clapham, was an English baronet from 1728 until 1742.

Education
He was educated at John Roysse's Free School in Abingdon, (now Abingdon School) c.1732-c.1739. His name appears on the 1732 School Roll.

Title
Following the death of his father Sir Henry Atkins, 4th Baronet he became the 5th Atkins baronet of Clapham, at the age of just two years old. He died at the young age of 16 in 1742.

See also
 List of Old Abingdonians

References

1726 births
1742 deaths
People from Clapham
People educated at Abingdon School
Baronets in the Baronetage of England